Jovan Janić is a medical doctor and politician in Serbia. He served in the Assembly of Vojvodina from 2012 to 2016 as a member of the Democratic Party (Demokratska stranka, DS).

Private career
Janić is a specialist doctor in general surgery from Kula, Vojvodina. In January 2015, he was appointed as director of the Vrbas General Hospital.

Politician
Janić was elected to the Vojvodina assembly in the 2012 Vojvodina provincial election for the Kula constituency seat. The DS won the election, and Janić served as a government supporter. He was also elected to the Kula municipal assembly in the concurrent 2012 Serbian local elections, although he resigned his mandate on 28 May 2012. In the provincial assembly, he was a member of the committee on petitions and proposals and the committee on health, social policy, and labour.

Vojvodina switched to a system of full proportional representation for the 2016 provincial election. Janić was given the forty-first position on the DS coalition's list and was not re-elected when the list won only ten mandates.

Electoral record

Provincial (Vojvodina)

References

1952 births
Living people
People from Kula, Serbia
Members of the Assembly of Vojvodina
Democratic Party (Serbia) politicians